Little Lover may refer to:

 "Little Lover", a song by AC/DC from the album High Voltage
 "Little Lover", a song by The Hollies from the album Stay with The Hollies